Krueppel-related zinc finger protein 1 is a protein that in humans is encoded by the HKR1 gene.

References

Further reading